GSA may refer to:

Commerce
 Citroën GSA, a French automobile 
 GameSpy Arcade, a utility for use with network computer games
 General sales agent, an airline sales representative
 Global mobile Suppliers Association, a not-for-profit industry organisation representing companies across the worldwide mobile ecosystem
 Global Sourcing Association, a trade association in the United Kingdom
 Google Search Appliance, a device for document indexing
 Gordon Stanfield Animation, a Canadian animation studio

Education
 Gay–straight alliance, a North American student organization
 German Scholars Agency, in Cambridge, Massachusetts, United States
 German Studies Association, an organization of scholars of Germany, Austria, and Switzerland
 Girls' Schools Association, in the United Kingdom
 Graduate student assistant
 Graduate student association
 Green Schools Alliance, in the United States

Schools 
 Gaiety School of Acting, in Dublin, Ireland
 German School of Athens, in Greece
 Gitam School of Architecture, at Gitam University, in Visakhapatnam, India
 Glasgow School of Art, in Scotland
 Governor's School for the Arts (Kentucky), in Danville, Kentucky, United States
 Guildford School of Acting, in England
 Guyana School of Agriculture

Government
 European GNSS Agency, an agency of the European Union 
 General Services Administration, a United States federal agency
 Ghana Standards Authority
 Groupement Spécial Autonome, now the Army Special Forces Brigade, French Army special forces command

Science
 Genetic sexual attraction
 Genetics Society of America
 General somatic afferent fibers
 Geological Society of America
 Geological Society of Australia
 Gerontological Society of America
 GNAS complex locus, a protein

Other uses 
 Gaudineer Scenic Area, in West Virginia, United States
 Gaye Su Akyol, Turkish singer, painter and anthropologist
 Girl Scouts of America, defunct
 Global Storage Architecture, a distributed file system
 Goan Sports Association, in Mumbai, India
 Long Pasia Airport, in Malaysia